South Korean boyband Super Junior had appeared in 83 music videos, most of which were in starring roles. Some of their music video has received recognition from critics and awarding bodies. The music video for "U", released in 2006, won the Popular Music Video Award at the 2006 edition of Golden Disc Awards. In 2009, they released the music video for "Sorry, Sorry" in support of their third album, Sorry, Sorry. The music video which features the song's dance routine was an instant hit in South Korea and skyrocketed their popularity in Asia. In 2020, it was listed as one of Globe Telecom's Iconic K-Pop Music Video. "Mr. Simple" music video, released in 2011 to support the album of the same name, won the 2011 Mashable Awards in the Viral Video of the Year category, won the 2012 Myx Music Awards's Favourite K-Pop Video, and was the recipient of the YouTube K-Pop Awards in the Most Viewed Video of The Year category. "Sexy, Free & Single" won three accolades; the 2013 Myx Music Awards's Favourite K-Pop Video, the Singapore's e-Awards in the Most Popular Music Video in K-pop category, and Favorite Asian Music Video in You2Play Awards. In 2018, music video for "Black Suit" won the International Video of the Year, also in the Myx Music Awards.

They had released eighteen video albums, and featured in further nine video albums as guest artist. Super Junior World Tour Super Show 4 Live in Japan was their best selling release in Japan, reaching number one in both Oricon DVD and Blu-Ray charts, selling more than 50,000 copies altogether in 2012.

Music videos

2000s

2010s

2020s

Video albums

Concert tours

Featured releases

Filmography

Leading role
{| class="wikitable plainrowheaders" style="text-align:center;"
|+ List of home medias of films and television shows with selected details, and charts positions
! scope="col" rowspan="3"| Title
! scope="col" rowspan="3"| Details
! scope="col" colspan="2"| Peak chart positions
! scope="col" rowspan="3"| Sales
|-
!width="60" colspan="2"|JPN
|-
!width="30"|DVD
!width="30"|Blu-ray
|-
!scope="row"|Attack on the Pin-Up Boys
|
Released: September 20, 2007
Re-released: September 25, 2013
Label: SM Pictures, Avex Entertainment
Format: DVD, Blu-ray
|54
|160
|
KOR: 14,000
|-
!scope="row"|Super Junior's Miracle Box 1
|
Released: August 6, 2010
Label: KR Content Group
Format: DVD
|159
|—
|
|-
!scope="row"|Super Junior's Miracle Box 2
|
Released: October 8, 2010
Label: KR Content Group
Format: DVD
|162
|—
|
|-
!scope="row"|All About Super Junior 'Treasure Within Us'''
|
Released: July 28, 2014
Label: SM Entertainment, SBS Viacom
Format: DVD
|—
|—
|
|-
!scope="row"|Super Junior Leeteuk Ryeowook The Friends in Switzerland (Set 1 and 2)
|
Released: December 21, 2016
Label: TBS Dignet
Format: DVD
|—
|—
|
|-
!scope="row"|Super Junior Returns|
Released: December 21, 2018
Label: Avex Pictures
Format: DVD
|22
|—
|
|-
!scope="row"|Super TV|
Released: December 6, 2019
Label: Avex Pictures
Format: DVD
|19
|—
|
|-
!scope="row"|SJ Returns 2: E.L.F's Dining Table|
Released: July 17, 2020
Label: Avex Pictures
Format: DVD
|10
|—
|
JPN: 1,481
|-
!scope="row"|Super TV2|
Released: February 26, 2021
Label: Stream Media Corporation
Format: DVD
|10
|—
|
JPN: 1,098
|-
!scope="row"|Super Junior Returns 3|
Released: May 27, 2022
Label: Stream Media Corporation
Format: DVD
|11
|—
|
JPN: 1,444
|-
| colspan="5" style="text-align:center; font-size:8pt;"| "—" denotes releases that did not chart or were not released in that territory or format.
|}

Featured role

Others
Other home medias

 See also 
 Subgroups''
 Super Junior-K.R.Y.#Videography
 Super Junior-T#Videography
 Super Junior-M#Videography
 Super Junior-H#Videography
 Super Junior-D&E discography#Music videos

Notes

References

Videographies of South Korean artists
Videography